Holger Sumelius (28 December 1901 – 6 December 1976) was a Finnish sailor. He competed in the mixed 6 metres at the 1936 Summer Olympics.

References

External links
 

Sportspeople from Tampere
Olympic sailors of Finland
Sailors at the 1936 Summer Olympics – 6 Metre
Finnish male sailors (sport)
1901 births
1976 deaths